Trafaria is a former civil parish in the municipality (concelho) of Almada, Lisbon metropolitan area, Portugal. In 2013, the parish merged into the new parish Caparica e Trafaria. The population in 2011 was 5,696, in an area of 5.73 km2.

References

Former parishes of Almada